|}

The Tommy Whittle Chase is a National Hunt handicap steeplechase in England which is open to horses aged four years or older. 
It is run at Haydock Park over a distance of about 2 miles and 7 furlongs (2 miles 6 furlongs and 204 yards, or 4,612 metres) and during its running there are 18 fences to be jumped. It is scheduled to take place each year in December.

The race was first run in 1982, and is named in honour of the late Tommy Whittle, a director of Haydock Park for 30 years, 13 of which were spent as chairman.

In 2004 the race had Grade 2 status and was considered sufficiently important to be included in the British Horseracing Board's new Order of Merit series.
However, the following year it was turned into a handicap, and as a result has since attracted a lower grade of runners.

Winners

See also
 Horse racing in Great Britain
 List of British National Hunt races

References

Racing Post:
, 

National Hunt races in Great Britain
Haydock Park Racecourse
National Hunt chases
Recurring sporting events established in 1982
1982 establishments in England